Alessandro Borghi (born 19 September 1986) is an Italian actor. He has appeared in more than twenty films since 2006. He is part of the main cast of Suburra and Suburra: Blood on Rome. He won the David di Donatello for Best Actor in 2019 for his portrayal of building surveyor Stefano Cucchi, a victim of police brutality, in the film On My Skin.

Filmography

Film

Television

References

External links 

1986 births
Living people
Male actors from Rome
Italian male film actors
David di Donatello winners
Nastro d'Argento winners